The 2008 Nicholson McLaren Engines British Hill Climb Championship season was the 62nd British Hill Climb Championship (BHCC) season. It was the last year in which Nicholson McLaren sponsored the championship, as MCL Motorhomes took over the championship sponsorship for 2009. The series was contested over 34 rounds, with the drivers' 28 best results counting for the championship. Scott Moran ended Martin Groves' dominance of the championship, by claiming the championship during round 27 at Gurston Down.

Calendar
 The 2008 season consisted of seventeen meetings with two rounds at each. Times with a light blue background are hill records.

Championship standings 
 Best 28 scores count towards the championship. Points are awarded to the drivers as follows:

References

External links 
 The official website of the British Hill Climb Championship

Hill Climb Championship season